Great Easton is a village and civil parish in the Uttlesford district in Essex, England.

Great Easton parish contains the hamlets of Gallows Green, Mill End Green and Duton Hill and shares a parish council with Tilty. The parish has a population of a few hundred people, measured at 1,035 in the 2011 census The village public house is The Swan, located close to the church. A further parish public house is The Green Man at Mill End Green. The parish church is dedicated to Saint John and Saint Giles.

History
Great Easton dates from the 12th century. The village used to be known as 'Easton ad montem' or 'Easton atte munte' to distinguish it from Little Easton. The suffix denotes the mound close to the church in the grounds of Easton Hall. It is believed to be the remains of a motte and bailey castle, around which the village has grown since medieval times. It is surrounded by a dry ditch 45 feet wide and 5 feet deep. The mound may have been pre-Roman, Saxon or perhaps a Norman defensive motte. It was definitely in place in Norman times, as this is the period in which the name 'Eystone ad montem' appears. Fifteenth-century houses make up most of the village today.

In the south porch of St John & St Giles church is an inscription (VII, pos. c. 1900) to a man found murdered in 1830 at Handless Spring. On the South wall of the churchyard there is an inscription which reads:
Near this spot lies a murdered man
Whos remains were found in Handless Spring.
Unfold the murderous deed if you can
And the Wretch or Wretches to justice bring.

An archaeological dig on the site of the abbey in 1942 turned up the stone tombs of two monks, thought to have been killed during the sacking of the Abbey in 1215. When their remains were examined before being reverently re-interred, it was found that one of the skeletons lacked a head.

Governance
Great Easton is part of the electoral ward called The Eastons. The population of this ward taken at the 2011 census was 1,577.

Church

The parish church of St John & St Giles owned by Rose Toynbee of Bridge Foot house is a Grade II* listed building. It is Norman in design and was built on the site of an earlier Saxon church. It contains Roman bricks, along with many of the houses in the village. It has had many alterations, and at one time was cruciform, but the north and south transepts have disappeared, and only thickened walls indicate the position of the crossing tower. By 1460 the tower had disappeared, and the three bells that were in use were housed in a timber cupola over the west end of the nave. But this was demolished in 1899 during a major refurbishment, and a large timber tower was built, far taller than the current low brick tower installed in 1928. It was struck by lightning, and its ancient timber was installed into many of the old Tudor houses, including the 'King Post' of the tower installed into Essex House, with a plaque reading 'KING POST of Old Wooden Tower, GREAT EASTON CHURCH, erected 1777, Demolished 1928.' This makes the post at least 235 years old, but this is only half as old as most of the houses surrounding the church.

Bert Pickford gave this account of his own unique perspective of the building of the new tower in 1928:

"When the new tower was being built, the bricks were hauled up using a large basket on a pulley. At the end of a day's work, the basket was left on the ground with the rope still taken up through the top pulley, whilst the rope's tail end was coiled up near the basket. One evening, a bunch of us boys aged between 7 and 14 were inspecting the work, or looking for mischief. I can't remember which, but expect it was the latter!

"We became very interested in the basket and rope and in no time at all the rope was uncoiled and, with a little help from us all, the basket got 'lift off' and was soon on its way to the top of the tower. This discovery was great, but to increase the entertainment and interest value, it was soon decided, without too much debating, that I, being the smallest and youngest, should view the village from above!

"The basket came down and I jumped in, without a care in the world, and slowly was hoisted to the top. At last I was at the top and the hauling team were nearly at the gate to the village green, shouting things such as, 'What can you see?' and 'What's it like?'

"All adventures must end, and so did ours. Eventually I was lowered to the ground, and remember the landing being a bit hard. Thinking back, it could have been a lot worse! I don't know how much spare 'boy power' there was on that rope, but I am grateful that they all held on."

See also
Easton Lodge
The Hundred Parishes

References

The Five Parishes - a brief history of Broxted, Tilty, Great Easton and Little Easton
By Clare Squibb

External links

Villages in Essex
Civil parishes in Essex
Uttlesford